Kavi Nazrul Metro Station  (formerly Garia Bazar) is a metro station at Garia, a part of the Kolkata Metro. It is named after the poet Kazi Nazrul Islam.

The station

Structure
Kavi Nazrul elevated metro station is situated on the Kolkata Metro Line 1 of Kolkata Metro.

Station layout

Connections

Bus 
Garia bus stand is serving near the station.

Bus route number 80A, 80B, 218, 228, SD5, KB17, JM4, 007, M8/1 (Mini), S101 (Mini),S112 (Mini), S113(Mini), C43, S5, S6A,  S7, S14, S15G, S21, AC37, AC5, AC6, AC37A, AC50, AC50A etc. serve near the station.

See also

Kolkata
List of Kolkata Metro stations
Transport in Kolkata
Kolkata Metro Rail Corporation
Kolkata Suburban Railway
Kolkata Monorail
Trams in Kolkata
Garia
E.M. Bypass
List of rapid transit systems
List of metro systems

References

External links

 
 
 Official Website for line 1
 UrbanRail.Net – descriptions of all metro systems in the world, each with a schematic map showing all stations.

Kolkata Metro stations
Railway stations opened in 2009
Railway stations in Kolkata
Kazi Nazrul Islam